José Carlos Leite de Sousa (born 9 October 1977) is a Portuguese retired footballer who played as a right back, and is a manager.

He amassed Primeira Liga totals of 159 matches and four goals during ten seasons, representing mainly in the competition Belenenses (five years).

Club career
Born in São João da Madeira, Sousa started playing with local A.D. Sanjoanense. In 1993, he joined the youth ranks of S.L. Benfica, from where he was loaned to F.C. Alverca who acted as the farm team.

After a successful debut season with the Ribatejo Province side, 20-year-old Sousa was recalled by Benfica manager Manuel José in August 1997, due to a good performance in a Segunda Liga match against F.C. Paços de Ferreira. Dubbed the new António Veloso by the press, he made his debut on 13 September 1997 in a Primeira Liga home draw against Académica de Coimbra, becoming a regular starter and scoring his first and only goal for the club in a 4–1 win over Sporting CP at the Estádio José Alvalade; Graeme Souness brought in Gary Charles midway through the 1998–99 campaign, and his playing time was subsequently vastly reduced.

In 1999, Sousa joined Alverca on a permanent deal, staying only one year before signing a five-year contract with FC Porto on 5 August 2000. He was consecutively loaned during his tenure at the latter, however.

On 21 August 2002, Sousa joined C.F. Os Belenenses on a one-year loan, signing on a permanent basis in the following season and always representing the Lisbon-based club in the top flight. Afterwards, he moved to Olympiakos Nicosia in Cyprus, before ending his career in 2010 after one season with F.C. Arouca.

In late June 2016, after a spell at Belenenses as youth coach, Sousa was appointed manager of third division team U.D. Vilafranquense.

International career
Sousa earned 18 caps for Portugal at youth level, all categories comprised. He made his debut for the under-21 team on 5 September 1998, playing the first half of a 3–0 away win against Hungary for the 2000 UEFA European Championship qualifiers.

Personal life
Sousa's uncle, António Sousa, was also a footballer. A midfielder, he too represented Sanjoanense and Porto, being a longtime Portuguese international. His cousin, Ricardo, also played in the Portuguese top division.

José's son Bruno Leite played the sport in Norway, mainly with Skeid Fotball.

References

External links

1977 births
Living people
People from São João da Madeira
Portuguese footballers
Association football defenders
Primeira Liga players
Liga Portugal 2 players
Segunda Divisão players
F.C. Alverca players
S.L. Benfica footballers
S.C. Braga players
FC Porto players
S.C. Farense players
C.F. Os Belenenses players
S.C. Beira-Mar players
F.C. Arouca players
Cypriot First Division players
Olympiakos Nicosia players
Portugal youth international footballers
Portugal under-21 international footballers
Portuguese expatriate footballers
Expatriate footballers in Cyprus
Portuguese expatriate sportspeople in Cyprus
Portuguese football managers
Sportspeople from Aveiro District